Alphamenes incertus is a species of wasp in the family Vespidae. It was described by de Saussure in 1875.

References

Vespidae
Insects described in 1875